Bonney's round ligament forceps, sometimes known as Berkely-Bonny's round ligament forceps, is a surgical instrument used in gynaecological surgery named after Victor Bonney.

References

External links
Bonney's round ligament forceps
Obstetrics Instruments - Forceps, round ligament, Bonney's pattern - Shape and dimensions

Surgical instruments